Turn Back the Clock is a 1933 American pre-Code MGM fantasy comedy-drama film directed by Edgar Selwyn, written by Selwyn and Ben Hecht, and starring Mae Clarke and Lee Tracy (while under contract to Metro-Goldwyn-Mayer).  The protagonist has 20 years of his life to live over.

Plot
On March 6, 1933, middle-aged cigar store owner Joe Gimlet runs into his childhood friend, banker Ted Wright. While having dinner with Joe and his wife Mary, Ted asks the couple to invest $4,000 in his company. Joe is excited by the idea, but Mary refuses to part with their savings. Angered by her reluctance, Joe gets drunk and declares to Mary that he should have married the wealthy Elvina. Drunkenly leaving their apartment, he is hit by a car and is brought to a hospital for surgery.

Joe wakes to discover that he is a young man again in the home of his youth.  A newspaper tells of Roosevelt returning from Africa (placing the date as 1910); it takes Joe a moment to realize the paper is talking about Theodore Roosevelt rather than Franklin Roosevelt. After scaring his mother with talk of the future, and after having to face the doctor who asks him if he wants to go crazy like his father, he decides to keep his past life to himself. Going to his job as a soda jerk, he meets Elvina. They soon become engaged. The engagement announcement crushes Joe's girlfriend, Mary, and his mother, who reminds him that money does not buy happiness.

After the wedding, Joe becomes rich due to his knowledge of the future.  Meanwhile, Mary and Ted, Joe’s old friend, get married.  Remembering the post war problems, Joe pledges one million dollars to help returning vets. His wife is enraged, but President Woodrow Wilson hails Joe as a hero and nominates him as the head of the War Industry.  Elvina openly mocks him, but they refuse to divorce to avoid scandal.

Years pass and in 1929 Joe goes into the cigar store and sees Ted working there.  At dinner with Ted and Mary, Joe offers Ted the chance to invest $4,000 in a venture.  Mary approves the idea, because she believes in Joe.

The venture does not go forward because Joe is ruined by the stock market crash, due to Elvina having invested their common savings in the stock market through a broker instead of putting it in a trust fund as Joe had told her to do.  Joe divorces Elvina, telling her that this time they are really washed up.  His bank employees plunder the bank and Joe is to be held responsible.

It is now March 6, 1933, the date of the car accident. Joe must now live his life with no knowledge of the future. He flees, and finding Mary, begs her to run away with him.  Mary tells him she cannot leave her husband. Joe is pursued by a horde of police officers and brought into custody. At that moment, he wakes up in the hospital room with his life returned as it was.  He tells Mary he wouldn’t change a thing about their life together.

Cast
 Lee Tracy as  Joe Gimlet 
 Mae Clarke as  Mary Gimlet/Mary Wright 
 Otto Kruger as  Ted Wright 
 George Barbier as  Pete Evans 
 Peggy Shannon as  Elvina Evans Wright/Elvina Evans Gimlet 
 C. Henry Gordon as  Dave Holmes 
 Clara Blandick as  Mrs. Gimlet, Joe's Mother
 Three Stooges as Wedding Singers (uncredited)

The Three Stooges
The Three Stooges featuring Curly Howard appear in a short uncredited role as wedding singers. They sing "Sweet Adeline".  Joe tells them to sing "something lively";  Larry Fine volunteers that they know "My Old Kentucky Home".  Forgetting the difference in years while drunk, Joe requests the Stooges sing "Tony's Wife" (a pop song from 1933), which the Stooges are unfamiliar with; Moe Howard then asks "Tony's wife? Who is she?" Although they are not credited as the Three Stooges (indeed, they receive no screen credit at all), this marks the first time the trio appeared as a group on film without their former leader, Ted Healy. They would launch their long-running film-shorts career a few months later.

See also
 The Three Stooges filmography

External links
 
 
 
 

1933 films
1930s fantasy comedy-drama films
American black-and-white films
Films directed by Edgar Selwyn
The Three Stooges films
Metro-Goldwyn-Mayer films
Films with screenplays by Ben Hecht
American fantasy comedy-drama films
1930s English-language films
1930s American films